Gmina Konstantynów is a rural gmina (administrative district) in Biała Podlaska County, Lublin Voivodeship, in eastern Poland.

The gmina contains part of the protected area called Podlasie Bug Gorge Landscape Park.

Villages
Gmina Konstantynów contains the villages and settlements of Antolin, Gnojno, Komarno, Komarno-Kolonia, Konstantynów, Konstantynów-Kolonia, Solinki, Wandopol, Wichowicze, Witoldów, Wólka Polinowska, Zakalinki, Zakalinki-Kolonia and Zakanale.

Neighbouring gminas
Gmina Konstantynów is bordered by the gminas of Janów Podlaski, Leśna Podlaska, Mielnik, Sarnaki and Stara Kornica.

References

External links
Polish official population figures 2006

Konstantynow
Biała Podlaska County